Happy Blue is the ninth studio album by Billy Squier. His first studio album of acoustic materials, it was released in 1998 and stands as his most recent studio work to date. The album, featuring blues music, was a departure from Squier's well-known rock music. No tracks from the album were released as singles.  Per Nielsen SoundScan, this long out of print disc sold just over 10,000 copies.

Track listing 

 "Happy Blues" (5:00)
 "The Pursuit of Happiness" (7:42)
 "She Will" (5:03)
 "Grasping for Oblivion" (4:57)
 "If You Would Hate Me Less, I'd Love You More" (6:30)
 "Stroke Me Blues" (4:43)
 "More Than Words Can Say" (3:42)
 "Inferno (Everybody Cries Sometimes)" (5:47)
 "Long Way To Fall" (5:09)
 "River" (5:15)
 "Two" (2:49)

References 

1998 albums
Billy Squier albums